Margaret Ruth Gibson (born 4 January 1961) is a Zimbabwean former rower. She competed in the women's coxless pair event at the 1992 Summer Olympics.

References

External links
 

1961 births
Living people
Zimbabwean female rowers
Olympic rowers of Zimbabwe
Rowers at the 1992 Summer Olympics
Place of birth missing (living people)